RAF Gailes was a ROTOR radar station in Ayrshire, Scotland.

History

RAF Gailes was built on the site of the earlier RAF Fullarton The buildings from the old GCI station were cleared by December 1950.

The station was short lived, becoming redundant when RAF Killard Point (Northern Ireland) became operational, in September 1956. The Signals Unit at Gailes was disbanded and the station placed on care and maintenance.

In 1962, the station was taken over by civilian staff from Air Traffic Control at Prestwick Airport.

Gailes was finally closed in 1978 and the buildings demolished when the Radar station staff moved to Atlantic House in Prestwick.

References

Royal Air Force stations in Scotland